Shirley Boys' High School (known as SBHS) is a single sex state (public) secondary school in Christchurch, New Zealand. It was originally situated on a 6 hectare site in the suburb of Shirley, but in April 2019 moved, along with Avonside Girls' High School, further east to the former QEII Park, 8.6 kilometres from the city centre.

The school colours are sky blue and gold.

Brief history
Parents in the eastern and northern suburbs of Christchurch had wanted single-sex education for their sons. In 1957, this finally became available when the school opened under its first Headmaster, Charles Gallagher.

Established on a swampy paddock formerly used for grazing horses to the west of North Parade, the School grew rapidly. Within a few years it became a self-confessed and proud rival to Christchurch Boys' High School as well as to St. Andrew's and St Bede's College.

A detailed satirical portrait of the school as it was in the late 1960s can be found in The Shining City, a novel by former student Stevan Eldred-Grigg

On the Easter weekend (April) of 2007, Shirley Boys' High School celebrated its 50th Jubilee. Commemorative events included an Old Boys' XV playing the current 2nd XV and the 1st XV playing in historic uniform against St. Andrew's College; as well as a golf tournament, formal black-tie dinner, staff luncheon and 'meet-and-greet evening'.

2011 earthquake 
During the magnitude 6.3 quake on 22 February the school suffered extensive damage and had to close. At least two classroom blocks were expected to be demolished, and all of the concrete areas of the school, including the new tennis courts, were badly damaged.

The students did not attend school for almost a month afterwards, before the decision was made to shift its pupils to Papanui High School – with Papanui High School's students changing to attend classes from 8 am until 1 pm, while the Shirley Boys' High School students entered the school at 1.15 pm and finished at 5.45 pm. After about 6 months of this arrangement pupils were able to return to the re-opened school in early September 2011.

Move to new site
Education Minister Hekia Parata announced on 16 October 2013 that the school would move, and be co-located with Avonside Girls' High School at a site in east Christchurch. On 12 February 2015 the site was announced to be the former QEII Park site.

The move to the new site was completed in April 2019.

Houses

Notable alumni

 Nathan Astle – Former New Zealand cricketer
 Tom Christie (rugby union) – Current Crusader
 Ryan Crotty – Former All Black and Canterbury Crusaders rugby player
 Stevan Eldred-Grigg – New Zealand novelist and historian
 Aaron Gilmore – Former Member of Parliament
 Craig Green – Former All Black wing
 Chris Jack – Former All Black lock
 Dave Jaggar – computer scientist and James Clerk Maxwell Medal winner
 Brodie McAlister – Current Crusader
 Hugh McCutcheon – Current United States men's national volleyball team head coach
 Craig McMillan – Former New Zealand cricketer
 Richard Petrie – Former New Zealand cricketer
 Setaimata Sa – Current Sydney Roosters Hull F.C. rugby league player
 Steve Scott – Former All Black halfback
 Bradley Shaw – Current Black Stick
 Hayden Shaw – Former Black Stick

References

External links
 Official Shirley Boys' High School website

Boys' schools in New Zealand
Educational institutions established in 1957
Secondary schools in Christchurch
1957 establishments in New Zealand